The ASAP Pop Viewers' Choice Awards is an annual award show that airs on the ABS-CBN cable channel, which is held on a Sunday afternoon during ASAP variety show every end of the year, usually in November or December. It honors the year's biggest television, movie, and music domestic acts, as voted by fans of the network.

Voting process
The noontime variety show, ASAP, will first release the official nominees for the year's awards show. Fans who wanted to vote for their selected celebrities will then be asked to vote in three ways. First, they can vote through ASAP's official website. They can also fill out the "POP Balota" included in Star Studio and Chalk magazines, then submit it in the respective ABS-CBN regional offices or National Book Store branches. Lastly, they can vote through their mobile phones by texting.

Events

Merit categories

Main

"Pop Music" category
Pop Female Artist: since 2006
Pop Male Artist: since 2006
Pop Song: since 2006
Pop Album: since 2006

"Pop Music Video" category
Pop Music Video: since 2006
Pop Celebrity Cameo in a Music Video: since 2006 (also known as "Pop Celebrity Appearance in Music Video")
Pop Band Performance: since 2006

"Pop Movie" category
Pop Movie Of the Year: since 2007
Pop Movie Theme Song: since 2006
Pop Screen Kiss: since 2006
Pop Love Team: since 2006

"Pop Kapamilya TV Show" category
Pop Kapamilya TV Show: since 2006
Pop Kapamilya TV Character: since 2006 (also known as "Pop Teleserye Character")
Pop TV Theme Song: since 2006 (also known as "Pop Teleserye Theme Song" or "Pop Kapamilya TV Theme Song")
Pop Soundtrack Album: since 2012

"Pop Astig" category
Pop Female Fashionista: since 2007
Pop Male Fashionista: since 2007
Pop Cover Girl: since 2006
Pop Cover Boy: since 2006 (also known as "Pop Pin-Up Boy")

Other categories
Pop Fans Club: since 2010
Pop Netizen: since 2012 (also known as "Pop Twittizen" or "Pop Twit")
Tween Popsies: since 2010

Occasional
Pop Kapamilya TV New Face: 2009 only
Pop K-Pop: 2010 only
Pop Female Cutie: 2010 only
Pop Male Cutie: 2010 only
Pop Sensation: 2011 only
Pop Breakthrough Star: 2013 only

Discontinued categories
Pop Female Performance: 2006-2009
Pop Male Performance: 2006-2009
Pop Band: 2006-2010

Winners list
Sarah Geronimo is the most awarded artist in the ASAP Pop Viewers' Choice Awards history.

The following are the list of winners:

1 only the "Pop Fashionista" award was given in 2006.
 —  categories that are not awarded in that year.
* only nominees are announced; no winners.
 discontinued categories.

Single recipients
Pop Kapamilya TV New Face: Zaijan Jaranilla
Pop K-Pop: Super Junior
Pop Female Cutie: Nadine Lustre
Pop Male Cutie: Daniel Padilla
Pop Sensation: Shamcey Supsup
Pop Breakthrough Star: Janella Salvador

See also

 List of Asian television awards

References

Annual television shows
Awards established in 2006
Philippine awards
Philippine music awards
Philippine television awards
Philippine film awards
ASAP (TV program)